Bevan Worcester (12 July 1925 – 14 February 1969) was an Australian sailor. He competed in the Dragon event at the 1952 Summer Olympics.

References

External links
 

1925 births
1969 deaths
Australian male sailors (sport)
Olympic sailors of Australia
Sailors at the 1952 Summer Olympics – Dragon
Sportspeople from Melbourne
People from Kew, Victoria